Elections to West Lindsey District Council were held on 3 May 2007. One third of the council was up for election and the Liberal Democrat Party held overall control of the council after what was seen as a straight fight with the Conservative Party.

The election in Scotter ward was decided by the toss of a coin which the Conservative candidate won.

After the election, the composition of the council was:
 Liberal Democrat 20
 Conservative 16
 Independent 1

Election result

One Independent candidate was unopposed.

Ward results

References

 2007 West Lindsey election result
 Ward results

2007
2007 English local elections
2000s in Lincolnshire